The 1979 World Table Tennis Championships men's singles was the 35th edition of the men's singles championship. 

Seiji Ono defeated Guo Yuehua in the final  after Yuehua was forced to retire during the fourth set due to leg cramps.

Results

+ retired injured

See also
 List of World Table Tennis Championships medalists

References

-